"Cryin' for Me (Wayman's Song)" is a song written and recorded by American country music artist Toby Keith. It was released in October 2009 as the second single from his 2009 album American Ride.  The song peaked at number 6 on the US Billboard Hot Country Songs chart.

Content
The song is a mid-tempo country ballad, mostly accompanied by acoustic guitar and saxophone. It was written as a tribute to basketball player and jazz musician Wayman Tisdale, who died on May 15, 2009. In it, the narrator is crying, but states he is not crying for Tisdale's death, rather crying for himself.

Keith had intended to perform the song at Tisdale's funeral, but was too emotional to complete it at the time; instead, he performed Willie Nelson's "Angel Flying Too Close to the Ground."

Critical reception
The song has been generally met with positive reception. Ken Tucker of Billboard magazine said that "Dave Koz's saxophone is a perfect accompaniment to the tender and touching 'Cryin' for Me (Wayman's Song)'," and Entertainment Weekly writer Whitney Pastorek called it a "sweet tribute  to a friend who passed away." Bobby Peacock of Roughstock called it "one of the best single releases of Toby's career" and compared its theme to Alan Jackson's "Sissy's Song," "but with a few more personal touches." Jonathan Keefe of Slant Magazine gave a mixed review of the song, saying that it was an example of "his genuinely empathic performances" but criticized the production by saying that the "chintzy" production had a negative effect on the song's sincerity. Sam Gazdziak of Engine 145 gave the song a thumbs-down rating, highlighting some of the specifics of Tisdale's life that were highlighted in the song, but saying, "Maybe if the song were more about those personal touches and less about Keith crying for himself, it wouldn't seem as dreary."

Music video
The music video, directed by Michael Salomon, premiered on CMT on November 2, 2009.

Chart performance
"Cryin' for Me (Wayman's Song)" debuted at number 58 on the Billboard Hot Country Songs on the week of October 17, 2009. During that week, Keith's "American Ride" was at Number One, and two other cuts from the album debuted as well: "Every Dog Has Its Day" at number 56 and "If I Had One" at number 59.

Year-end charts

References

2009 singles
2009 songs
Toby Keith songs
Songs written by Toby Keith
Music videos directed by Michael Salomon
Commemoration songs
Show Dog-Universal Music singles
Songs about basketball players